USS LST-944 was an  in the United States Navy. Like many of her class, she was not named and is properly referred to by her hull designation.

Construction
LST-944 was laid down on 11 August 1944, at Hingham, Massachusetts, by the Bethlehem-Hingham Shipyard; launched on 3 September 1944; and commissioned on 4 October 1944.

Service history
During World War II LST-944 was assigned to the Asiatic-Pacific theater and participated in the assault and occupation of Iwo Jima in February 1945, and the assault and occupation of Okinawa Gunto from April through June 1945.

She returned to the United States and was decommissioned on 19 December 1945, and struck from the Navy list on 8 January 1946. On 26 September 1947, the ship was sold to the Boston Metals Co., of Baltimore, Maryland, for scrapping.

Awards
LST-944 earned two battle star for World War II service.

Notes

Citations

Bibliography 

Online resources

External links
 

 

1944 ships
LST-542-class tank landing ships
Ships built in Hingham, Massachusetts
World War II amphibious warfare vessels of the United States